Exceeding the UK, catching the USA alternatively translated as surpassing Great Britain and catching up with the United States, was a slogan put forward by Mao Zedong around 1958, which included the two goals of surpassing Great Britain in steel production in 15 years and catching up with the United States in 50 years. Steel is the top priority of the slogan.

"Exceeding the UK, catching the USA" was a very representative slogan during the Great Leap Forward. This slogan was mainly addressed to the secondary sector of the economy.

After the Great Chinese Famine, Mao Zedong relaxed the time scale of "exceeding the UK, catching the USA" to more than 100 years in his speech at the Seven Thousand Cadres Conference.

See also
 Great Leap Forward
 Launching satellites
 Ryazan miracle

References

1950s in China
Chinese advertising slogans
Campaigns of the Chinese Communist Party
Economic history of the People's Republic of China
Great Leap Forward